Mark of the Devil  is a 2020 Mexican horror film distributed by Corazón Films, and directed by Diego Cohen. The story revolves around a priest specializing in exorcisms and his adopted son, abandoned during his childhood by a Mennonite group. The life of the exorcists will change when they meet the Cuevas family and face the demon that persecutes the eldest daughter. The film stars Eduardo Noriega as the title character.

Cast 
 Eduardo Noriega as Tomás
 Eivaut Rischen as Karl Nüni
 Diego Escalona Zaragoza as Young Karl
 Lumi Cavazos as Cecilia de la Cueva
 Nicolasa Ortíz Monasterio as Fernanda de la Cueva
 Omar Fierro as Luis Miranda
 Arantza Ruiz as Camila de la Cueva
 Laura de Ita as Esperanza

References

External links 
 

2020 films
2020s Spanish-language films
2020s supernatural horror films
Mexican supernatural horror films
2020s Mexican films
Films about exorcism